Holden B. Mathewson House is a historic home at South Otselic in Chenango County, New York. It is a large, Colonial Revival–style residence built in 1908–1909.  It is a -story, frame structure on a rusticated stone foundation, surmounted by a tall hipped roof with gabled dormers.

It was added to the National Register of Historic Places in 2009.

References

Houses on the National Register of Historic Places in New York (state)
Colonial Revival architecture in New York (state)
Houses in Chenango County, New York
National Register of Historic Places in Chenango County, New York